Herald AV Publications is a British record label.

Founded in 1984, Herald AV Publications was set up as a specialist Catholic recording company. It serves both to promote established professional artists and to provide an outlet for new artists. Beginning with recordings of monastic chant, it now has over one hundred titles in its catalogue, ranging from 10th century chant to 20th century organ music; from spirituals to traditional anthems; from youth and school choirs to music for centres of pilgrimage; from hymns with full brass accompaniment to Christmas carols.

Musicians and choirs
Ralph Allwood
Sarah Baldock
Stephen Farr
David Goode
Naji Hakim
Michael Howard

Recording locations
Brentwood Cathedral
Chichester Cathedral
Douai Abbey
Ely Cathedral
Eton College Chapel, Eton
Farnborough Abbey
London Oratory
Notre Dame de Paris
Quarr Abbey
Reims Cathedral
Rochester Cathedral
Southwark Cathedral
St George's Chapel, Windsor
Vatican City
Westminster Cathedral
Winchester Cathedral
Worth Abbey

See also
Mary Berry
Early Music
Gregorian Chant
Chichester Psalms
List of Roman Catholic Church musicians
List of record labels

References
The Oxford Times.  Review of "Commotio - Night"
Classical Music - the official website of BBC Music Magazine - Review of "Carols From Chichester"

External links
The Herald AV Publications homepage

British record labels
Record labels established in 1984
Classical music record labels